Alboculus is a monotypic genus of east Asian spiders in the family Phrurolithidae containing the single species, Alboculus zhejiangensis.  it has only been found in China. A female was originally described under the name "Phrurolithus zhejiangensis", but was described under its new name when a male was identified by K. K. Liu, H. P. Luo and Y. H. Ying in 2020.

See also
 Phrurolithus
 Otacilia
 List of Phrurolithidae species

References

Further reading

Monotypic Phrurolithidae genera
Spiders of China